Café au lait is coffee with hot milk added. 

Café au lait may also refer to:

Films
Métisse, a French film that is also titled Café au lait.
You, Me and Him, a Brazilian short film that is also titled Café com Leite.

Other
Café au Lait (color)
Café au lait spot, a type of birthmark
Café com leite politics, Brazilian politics under the Old Republic